The  is a series of military light trucks that are used as mini SUVs in the JSDF. They have been under production by Mitsubishi Motors since 1973. In JSDF service, it is officially known as the 1/2 Ton Truck. They are powered by Mitsubishi-made 4-cylinder diesel engines with a total of 123 horsepower.

History

First generation

The first Type 73 Kyūs had been placed into production in 1973 with the chassis of the Jeep CJ-3B for basis before they made modifications based on it to create the Mitsubishi CJ-3B-J4 and the Mitsubishi CJ-3B-J4C before it was replaced again by producing the Mitsubishi CJ-5A-J54. Both gasoline and diesel variants were produced and a total over 200,000 units were made. Production continued on before it ended in 1997 after the Type 73 Light Truck Shins were placed in production by 1996.

The Kyūs had been exported out of Japan, mostly declared as military surplus vehicles to the Philippines and South Vietnam with the latter using it as one of the main jeeps of the ARVN, next to the Willys M606, M38A1 and M151A1 during the course of the Vietnam War. They have also been exported to New Zealand for civilian use.

Second generation

The  began production in 1996 as Mitsubishi Motors began to slowly phase out the Type 73 Light Truck Kyūs from production and from selective service in the JSDF, using the frame of the Mitsubishi Pajero as a basis.

The Type 73 Light Truck Shin can be mounted with various heavy machine guns and anti-tank missile launchers. But like its predecessor, the Shin Light Truck can mount Sumitomo M2 machine guns and, for the first time, the Sumitomo MINIMI Light Machine Gun.

When Shin Light Trucks were deployed to Iraq as part of the JIRSG, the vehicles were bulletproofed due to concerns that Iraqi guerrillas would target their vehicles to provoke JSDF troops who, under the restrictions of Article 9 of the Japanese Constitution, are not supposed to participate in any kind of offensive combat operations.

Design

Both Kyū and Shin light truck vehicles can be outfitted with various weapon systems such as Kawasaki Type 64 anti-tank pods, Kawasaki Type 79 and Kawasaki Type 87 anti-tank missile launchers, Japan Steel Works Type 60 recoilless rifles, Sumitomo MINIMI LMGs and Sumitomo M2 machine guns to make them both a mobile anti-tank and anti-personnel vehicle. 

Both light truck variants have the tarpaulin hood mounts at the rear as an option. They also have rear seats that can be folded up when they are not needed. Air conditioning is installed as a standard feature.

Variants
The base Kyu models for personnel and light cargo transport were designated J24A, J25A and J23A. 'A2' versions carried a wireless communications system Type 3. 'P' versions carried a recoil-less rifle, 'K' versions an anti-tank guided missile launcher Type 87. 'G-E' and 'G-N' versions carried a Type 79 guided missile launcher for either anti-tank or anti-landing craft us. 'SR' versions carried a radar system and had jacks to stabilize the vehicle. The 'SH' version carried an orientation system while the 'SC' version carried a communication relay system. 'SR, 'SH' and 'SC' versions were all equipped with winches. Small numbers were produced with small megaphones, roof-mounted single beacons and grille flashers. The Light Trucks were painted in white as they were exclusively used by JSDF military police units.

Users

Current
  - Currently using the Shin Light Trucks in the JGSDF. Kyū Light Trucks have been decommissioned from some frontline units, though many are still in service.
  - Used as surplus vehicles by the Philippine Army.

Former
  - Formerly used by the ARVN.

References

  Kenkyusha's New Japanese-English Dictionary, Kenkyusha Limited, Tokyo 1991,

External links

 Official JGSDF Page.

Japan Self-Defense Forces
Military light utility vehicles
Cold War military equipment of Japan
All-wheel-drive vehicles
Type 73 Light Truck
Military vehicles introduced in the 1970s
Military vehicles of Japan